The Lebanese thin-toed gecko (Mediodactylus amictopholis) is a species of lizard in the family Gekkonidae.
It is found in Lebanon, Syria and Israel.
Its natural habitat is elevated rocky areas.
It is threatened by habitat loss.

References

Mediodactylus
Reptiles described in 1967
Taxonomy articles created by Polbot